Bəyəhmədyurd (also, Beyakhmedyurd and Beyakhmed-Yurdu) is a village in the Khizi Rayon of Azerbaijan.  The village forms part of the municipality of Baxışlı.

References 

Populated places in Khizi District